"Split" is a song by industrial rock band KMFDM, released in 1991 between their albums Naïve and Money. The song reached No. 46 on Billboard's Dance/Club Play Songs Chart in July 1991. The tracks on the single are also included on the singles compilation album, Extra, Vol. 1.

Track listing
All songs written and composed by En Esch and Sascha Konietzko.

1991 release

2008 7" reissue

Personnel
Sascha Konietzko – vocals (1-4), bass, synths, programming (1-4)
Günter Schulz – guitars (1-4)
En Esch – vocals (1, 3, 4)
Rudolph Naomi – drums (2-4)
Christine Siewert – vocals (2-4)
Dorona Alberti – vocals (1)

References

1991 singles
KMFDM songs
1991 songs
Wax Trax! Records singles
Songs written by Sascha Konietzko
Songs written by Günter Schulz
Songs written by En Esch